Cevizli may refer to:

 Cevizli, Akseki, village in Antalya Province, Turkey
 Cevizli, Bayat
 Cevizli, Çameli
 Cevizli, Erzincan
 Cevizli, Gelibolu
 Cevizli, İscehisar, village in Afyonkarahisar Province, Turkey
 Cevizli, Oğuzlar
 Cevizli, Şavşat, village in Artvin Province, Turkey
 Cevizli, İskele, quarter of Trikomo, Cyprus
 Cevizli, Ortaköy
 Kivisili, village in Larnaca District, Cyprus